Euthrix is a genus of moths in the family Lasiocampidae. The genus was erected by Johann Wilhelm Meigen in 1830. It includes the following species:
Euthrix fossa
Euthrix hani
Euthrix imitatrix
?Euthrix improvisa
Euthrix laeta
Euthrix lao
Euthrix nigropuncta
Euthrix ochreipuncta
Euthrix orboy
Euthrix potatoria
Euthrix sherpai
Euthrix tamahonis
Euthrix tsini
Euthrix vulpes

References

External links

Lasiocampidae